Craig Robert Kusick (September 30, 1948 – September 27, 2006) was an American professional baseball first baseman and designated hitter. He played in Major League Baseball for the Minnesota Twins and Toronto Blue Jays.

His son, Craig Kusick, Jr. led Wisconsin–LaCrosse to the 1995 Division III football championship as a quarterback, received the Melberger Award as the top Division III player, and later played in the Arena Football League.

Biography
Born in Milwaukee, Wisconsin, Kusick grew up in the suburb of Greenfield. After attending the University of Wisconsin–La Crosse, he was signed by the Twins in 1970. He broke in with the team in September 1973, and gradually took over first base duties from Harmon Killebrew, but was primarily used as a DH from 1976 to 1978 when Rod Carew was moved over from second base. On August 27, 1975, Kusick tied a major league record by being hit by pitches three times in an 11-inning game against the Milwaukee Brewers. His career peaked with a 1977 season in which he batted .254 with 12 home runs and 45 runs batted in. After hitting .173 in 1978, and posting a .241 mark through 24 games in 1979, his contract was sold to the Toronto Blue Jays in midseason. He hit .204 in 24 more games with the Blue Jays before being released after the season. Kusick subsequently signed with the San Diego Padres but never made it back to the major leagues.

Kusick ended his career with a .235 batting average, 46 HRs, 171 RBI, 291 hits, 155 runs and 11 stolen bases in 497 games. In his brief stint with Toronto he also made one appearance as a relief pitcher in a 24–2 blowout loss against the California Angels, allowing three hits and two runs in  innings for a 4.91 earned run average.

Kusick later was named baseball coach at Rosemount High School in Rosemount, Minnesota from 1982 to 2004. Seven of his teams played in the state tournament.

Personal life
A resident of Apple Valley, Minnesota, Kusick died of leukemia on September 27, 2006, three days before his 58th birthday, in St. Paul. He died nine months after his wife Sarabeth
(October 27, 1949 – December 22, 2005) succumbed to ovarian cancer; they were survived by their two children.

References

External links
, or Retrosheet, or Pura Pelota

1948 births
2006 deaths
Águilas del Zulia players
American expatriate baseball players in Canada
Baseball players from Milwaukee
Deaths from cancer in Minnesota
Charlotte Hornets (baseball) players
Deaths from leukemia
Evansville Triplets players
Hawaii Islanders players
Lynchburg Twins players
Major League Baseball designated hitters
Major League Baseball first basemen
Minnesota Twins players
People from Apple Valley, Minnesota
Sportspeople from Minnesota
St. Cloud Rox players
Tacoma Twins players
Tigres de Aragua players
American expatriate baseball players in Venezuela
Toronto Blue Jays players
University of Wisconsin–La Crosse alumni
Wisconsin–La Crosse Eagles baseball players
Wisconsin–La Crosse Eagles football players